Asia Venture Group Sdn Bhd (AVG) is a private holding company investing in digital businesses. AVG invests in early stage companies, and has since inception, co-founded 4 companies: iMoney, TrustedCompany, iprice and HappyFresh. The company focuses on digitally scalable business models in Southeast Asia.

History 
AVG was incorporated in Kuala Lumpur by German entrepreneur Tim Marbach in 2013. That year, AVG invested USD500,000 in imoney.my, a Malaysia-based financial products comparison site. In November 2013, AVG co-founded its second company, TrustedCompany, a review platform for e-commerce businesses in Malaysia, India and Brazil.

In 2014, Kai Kux joined AVG as its Managing Director. AVG co-founded its third and fourth companies in 2014. iPrice is a one stop platform for e-commerce discovery in Southeast Asia. HappyFresh is an online grocery platform with one hour delivery service, which commenced operation at the end of 2014.

As of 2016, AVG (together with its co-founded companies) had a presence in 8 cities and 13 offices, with more than 1,000 employees from more than 35 countries.

Investments 
As of 2016 AVG had invested in more than 20 companies, predominantly early stage companies, such as: KFit, Scalable Capital or Movinga.  AVG has already exited some investments such as Audibene,  and Returbo.

References 

2013 establishments in Malaysia
Privately held companies of Malaysia
Companies based in Kuala Lumpur
Financial services companies established in 2013
Malaysian companies established in 2013
Investment management companies of Malaysia